Patricia Wangechi Kihoro (born 4 January 1986) is a Kenyan singer, songwriter, actress, radio and reality television personality. She rose into prominence after she participated in the third season of Tusker Project Fame, where she became one of the finalists. In acting, she has appeared in a number of local productions like the 2011 film, Miss Nobody, which saw her being nominated in the 2012 Kalasha Awards for best lead actress in a film. In television production, she has been cast as a lead in Groove Theory, a musical drama and as a regular in Demigods, Changes, Rush and Makutano Junction. As a radio presenter, she has worked with One FM and Homeboyz FM. Patricia is a content creator, influencer and youtuber.

Early life 
Kihoro, born in January 1986 and raised in Kenya's capital Nairobi, attended Shepherd's Junior Primary School for her primary school and later moved on to Moi Girls' High School, Nairobi. After her O levels, she enrolled in Moi University in the school of science and psychology. While at Moi University, she opted to audition for the third season of Tusker Project Fame. Patricia is a youtuber who she shares her real life experiences of travel adventures and make-up routines

Career

2009–12 
In March 2009, Kihoro auditioned for the reality singing competition Tusker Project Fame . In 2010 she was featured in the music video for Just a Band's song Ha-he that focused on the hero Makmende and attracted global attention. In 2011 she played Pet Nanjala in drama series Changes. The same year she played the leading role in the film, Miss Nobody that led her to be nominated at the 2011 Kalasha Awards for the "Lead Actress in Film" category.
In the 2012, she was cast as one of the leads in musical drama Groove Theory. She portrayed Biscuit, Zamm's (portrayed by Kevin Maina) love interest, in a story that revolved around the lives of five students at the fictional Victoria University.

2013–14
In 2013 she appeared in reality show The Fattening Room, that led her fellow cast members and she to explore the customs and traditions of Efik people in south-east Nigeria.
In 2014, she was cast as Nana, a 28-year-old editor in the series, Rush. She played alongside Janet Mbugua, Wendy Kimani, Wendy Sankale and Maryanne Nundo.

2015–present 
In 2015, Kihoro was cast as Maqbul Mohammed's daughter in series, Makutano Junction. In 2018 Kihoro played the role of Josephine, the new young bride of one of the main characters' father, in the critically acclaimed and controversial film Rafiki. She is also a radio host.

Discography

Filmography

Films and television

Awards and nominations

References

External links 

 
 Patricia Kihoro at SoundCloud

1986 births
Living people
21st-century Kenyan women singers
Kenyan television actresses
Kenyan film actresses
21st-century Kenyan actresses
Moi University alumni
Kikuyu people
People from Nairobi